Filmworks XVIII: The Treatment features a score for film by John Zorn. The album was released on Zorn's own label, Tzadik Records, in 2006 and contains music that Zorn wrote and recorded for the romantic comedy, The Treatment (2006), directed by Oren Rudavsky.

Reception
The Allmusic review by Thom Jurek awarded the album 4 stars stating "This plays, as have all of Zorn's scores of late, like a piece, a gorgeous piece of divinely inspired tight writing that brings not only the Argentinean tango to mind, but also klezmer, Yiddish folk music, and even cantorial music. There is a bit of Radical Jewish Culture in everything Zorn writes, and this set is a furthering of his own vision. Suffice it to say, and even though he doesn't let on in the liner notes, his scoring of The Treatment may have even surprised the composer himself". 
John Zorn who composed the score for the film won a MacArthur Foundation, the "Genius" award for his music in 2006.

Track listing
All compositions by John Zorn
 "The Treatment" - 3:34 
 "Romance" - 5:10
 "Why Me?" - 3:56
 "Family" - 2:15
 "Marking Time" - 4:53
 "Anxieties" - 5:00
 "Freud's Rondo" - 4:26
 "Totem and Taboo" - 6:55
 "Rush Hour" - 3:47
 "Bad Dreams" - 1:20
 "Uncertainty" - 6:24
 "Happy Ending" - 2:44

Personnel
Shanir Ezra Blumenkranz - bass 
Rob Burger - accordion 
Mark Feldman - violin 
Kenny Wollesen - vibraphone 
Marc Ribot - guitar

References

Tzadik Records soundtracks
Albums produced by John Zorn
John Zorn soundtracks
2006 soundtrack albums
Film scores